Carlos Eduardo Oliveira Dias (born 23 January 2000), commonly known as Carlos Dias, is a Brazilian professional footballer who currently plays as a midfielder for Cypriot First Division club APOEL.

Career

APOEL 
In May 2020 APOEL signed Dias from Paraná.

References

APOEL FC Official Website - Ποδοσφαιριστές 2020/21

External links
Profile on Soccerway

2000 births
Living people
Brazilian footballers
Association football midfielders
Brazilian expatriate footballers
Expatriate footballers in Cyprus
Paraná Clube players
APOEL FC players